Sidney Leon Catlett (April 18, 1948 – November 3, 2017) was an American basketball player.

He played collegiately for the University of Notre Dame.

He was selected by the Cincinnati Royals in the fourth round (55th pick overall) of the 1971 NBA draft.

He played for the Royals (1971–72) in the NBA for 9 games.

He is the son of the jazz drummer Sid Catlett. Catlett died on November 3, 2017, from complications of a brain bleed.

References

External links

1948 births
2017 deaths
20th-century African-American sportspeople
Basketball players from Washington, D.C.
Basketball players from Maryland
Cincinnati Royals draft picks
Cincinnati Royals players
DeMatha Catholic High School alumni
Notre Dame Fighting Irish men's basketball players
Parade High School All-Americans (boys' basketball)
People from Prince George's County, Maryland
African-American basketball players
American men's basketball players
Forwards (basketball)